Julie Hamilton is an Australian actress. She was nominated for the 1987 AFI Award for Best Actress in a Supporting Role for her role in The Place at the Coast and for a Logie Award for Best Actress for I Can Jump Puddles. Other roles include films Holy Smoke!, The Fourth Wish and Burke & Wills, television roles in The Shiralee, Melba and The Oracle and on stage in Shirley Valentine, Travelling North, Broadway Bound and Simon Gray's Close of Play.

References

External links
 

Living people
Australian television actresses
Australian film actresses
Australian stage actresses